Cambridge Assessment International Education (informally known as Cambridge International or simply Cambridge and formerly known as CIE, Cambridge International Examinations) is a provider of international qualifications, offering examinations and qualifications to 10,000 schools in more than 160 countries. It is as a non-profit and non-teaching department of the University of Cambridge.

History

Cambridge Assessment is part of the University of Cambridge and was founded in 1858 as the University of Cambridge Local Examinations Syndicate. Cambridge Assessment merged with another department of the University of Cambridge, Cambridge University Press, in August 2021 to form Cambridge University Press & Assessment - one of several mergers and acquisitions during its history.

For more detailed histories go to University of Cambridge Local Examinations Syndicate and Cambridge University Press.

Qualifications
Cambridge Assessment offers primarily school-leaving qualifications for university entrance such as the Cambridge International General Certificate of Education – Advanced Level (Cambridge International GCE A-Levels). In addition, Cambridge Assessment provides Key Stage examinations for primary and secondary schools internationally.

Recognition

Cambridge qualifications are recognized for admission by all UK universities as well as universities in the United States (Stanford and all Ivy League universities), Canada, the European Union, the Middle East, West Asia, New Zealand, Pakistan, Bangladesh, Sri Lanka, Nepal, Kazakhstan as well as in other countries.

Partnerships 
Cambridge Assessment is engaged in partnerships with governments of 25 countries on integrated curriculum and assessment design and professional development for teachers.

Philanthropy 
As part of its corporate social responsibility initiatives, Cambridge Assessment provides charitable support for children from troubled backgrounds.

Criticism 
Cambridge Assessment International Education has been criticized for continuing its colonial educational practices in its literature curricula. A study showed that Cambridge Assessment privileges European male authors and consistently under-represents female authors from developing countries.
It also has no consideration for third world countries culture customs and religion when it comes to their international secondary school coursebooks.

References

External links
 
 Cambridge Assessment website
 Cambridge University Press & Assessment

 01
 01
International Education
International school associations
School qualifications